Aguts is a commune in the Tarn department and Occitanie region of southern France.

The name comes from the Latin accutis, meaning "pointed (summit)".

Population

See also
Communes of the Tarn department

References

Communes of Tarn (department)